The 1816 United States presidential election in Louisiana took place between November 1 to December 4, 1816, as part of the 1816 United States presidential election. The state legislature chose three representatives, or electors to the Electoral College, who voted for President and Vice President.

During this election, Louisiana cast its three electoral votes to Democratic Republican candidate and Secretary of State James Monroe.

See also
 United States presidential elections in Louisiana

References

Louisiana
1816
1816 Louisiana elections